Riverdale is a borough in Morris County, in the U.S. state of New Jersey. As of the 2020 United States census, the borough's population was 4,107, an increase of 548 (+15.4%) from the 2010 census count of 3,559, which in turn reflected an increase of 1,061 (+42.5%) from the 2,498 counted at the 2000 Census.

History

Riverdale was incorporated as a borough by an act of the New Jersey Legislature on March 12, 1923, from portions of Pequannock Township, subject to the results of a referendum passed on April 17, 1923.

Geography and climate
According to the United States Census Bureau, the borough had a total area of 2.07 square miles (5.35 km2), including 2.03 square miles (5.25 km2) of land and 0.04 square miles (0.11 km2) of water (1.98%).

The borough is bordered by the municipalities of Butler and Kinnelon to the west and by Pequannock Township to the south, all in Morris County; and by Bloomingdale to the north and Pompton Lakes to the east in Passaic County.

Demographics

2010 census

The Census Bureau's 2006–2010 American Community Survey showed that (in 2010 inflation-adjusted dollars) median household income was $86,328 (with a margin of error of +/− $9,294) and the median family income was $97,900 (+/− $13,684). Males had a median income of $63,750 (+/− $13,660) versus $52,083 (+/− $4,896) for females. The per capita income for the borough was $39,675 (+/− $3,548). About 2.1% of families and 2.6% of the population were below the poverty line, including 4.1% of those under age 18 and 4.3% of those age 65 or over.

2000 census
As of the 2000 United States census there were 2,498 people, 919 households, and 671 families residing in the borough. The population density was 1,215.2 people per square mile (468.2/km2). There were 940 housing units at an average density of 457.3 per square mile (176.2/km2). The racial makeup of the borough was 93.39% White, 1.08% African American, 0.04% Native American, 2.72% Asian, 1.60% from other races, and 1.16% from two or more races. Hispanic or Latino of any race were 4.40% of the population.

Riverdale has a substantial Italian population, with 25.1% of residents reporting that they were of Italian ancestry in the 2000 Census.

There were 919 households, out of which 32.1% had children under the age of 18 living with them, 60.2% were married couples living together, 10.0% had a female householder with no husband present, and 26.9% were non-families. 21.1% of all households were made up of individuals, and 7.4% had someone living alone who was 65 years of age or older. The average household size was 2.68 and the average family size was 3.14.

In the borough the population was spread out, with 23.5% under the age of 18, 7.4% from 18 to 24, 33.5% from 25 to 44, 23.6% from 45 to 64, and 12.1% who were 65 years of age or older. The median age was 37 years. For every 100 females, there were 94.1 males. For every 100 females age 18 and over, there were 90.7 males.

The median income for a household in the borough was $71,083, and the median income for a family was $79,557. Males had a median income of $50,457 versus $41,420 for females. The per capita income for the borough was $31,187. About 3.0% of families and 5.3% of the population were below the poverty line, including 6.9% of those under age 18 and 3.7% of those age 65 or over.

Government

Local government
Riverdale is governed under the Borough form of New Jersey municipal government, which is used in 218 municipalities (of the 564) statewide, making it the most common form of government in New Jersey. The governing body is comprised of the Mayor and the Borough Council, with all positions elected at-large on a partisan basis as part of the November general election. The Mayor is elected directly by the voters to a four-year term of office. The Borough Council is comprised of six members elected to serve three-year terms on a staggered basis, with two seats coming up for election each year in a three-year cycle. The Borough form of government used by Riverdale is a "weak mayor / strong council" government in which council members act as the legislative body with the mayor presiding at meetings and voting only in the event of a tie. The mayor can veto ordinances subject to an override by a two-thirds majority vote of the council. The mayor makes committee and liaison assignments for council members, and most appointments are made by the mayor with the advice and consent of the council.

, the Mayor of Riverdale is Republican Paul M. Carelli, whose term of office ends December 31, 2023. Members of the Borough Council are Council President Vincent L. Pellegrini (R, 2023), Dave Desai (R, 2024), Michael Kheyfets (R, 2023), Matt Oswald (R, 2024), Paul A. Purcell (R, 2022) and Stephen W. Revis (R, 2022).

Federal, state and county representation
Riverdale is located in the 11th Congressional District and is part of New Jersey's 40th state legislative district. Prior to the 2011 reapportionment following the 2010 Census, Riverdale had been in the 26th state legislative district.

 

Morris County is governed by a Board of County Commissioners comprised of seven members who are elected at-large in partisan elections to three-year terms on a staggered basis, with either one or three seats up for election each year as part of the November general election. Actual day-to-day operation of departments is supervised by County Administrator, John Bonanni. , Morris County's Commissioners are
Commissioner Director Tayfun Selen (R, Chatham Township, term as commissioner ends December 31, 2023; term as director ends 2022),
Commissioner Deputy Director John Krickus (R, Washington Township, term as commissioner ends 2024; term as deputy director ends 2022),
Douglas Cabana (R, Boonton Township, 2022), 
Kathryn A. DeFillippo (R, Roxbury, 2022),
Thomas J. Mastrangelo (R, Montville, 2022),
Stephen H. Shaw (R, Mountain Lakes, 2024) and
Deborah Smith (R, Denville, 2024).
The county's constitutional officers are the County Clerk and County Surrogate (both elected for five-year terms of office) and the County Sheriff (elected for a three-year term). , they are 
County Clerk Ann F. Grossi (R, Parsippany–Troy Hills, 2023),
Sheriff James M. Gannon (R, Boonton Township, 2022) and
Surrogate Heather Darling (R, Roxbury, 2024).

Politics
As of March 2011, there were a total of 2,378 registered voters in Riverdale, of which 419 (17.6%) were registered as Democrats, 803 (33.8%) were registered as Republicans and 1,155 (48.6%) were registered as Unaffiliated. There was one voter registered to another party.

In the 2012 presidential election, Republican Mitt Romney received 56.5% of the vote (1,085 cast), ahead of Democrat Barack Obama with 42.5% (816 votes), and other candidates with 1.0% (19 votes), among the 1,932 ballots cast by the borough's 2,659 registered voters (12 ballots were spoiled), for a turnout of 72.7%. In the 2008 presidential election, Republican John McCain received 56.8% of the vote (1,044 cast), ahead of Democrat Barack Obama with 41.7% (766 votes) and other candidates with 1.0% (19 votes), among the 1,837 ballots cast by the borough's 2,347 registered voters, for a turnout of 78.3%. In the 2004 presidential election, Republican George W. Bush received 61.7% of the vote (916 ballots cast), outpolling Democrat John Kerry with 36.9% (548 votes) and other candidates with 0.7% (13 votes), among the 1,485 ballots cast by the borough's 1,973 registered voters, for a turnout percentage of 75.3.

In the 2013 gubernatorial election, Republican Chris Christie received 70.0% of the vote (795 cast), ahead of Democrat Barbara Buono with 29.0% (329 votes), and other candidates with 1.1% (12 votes), among the 1,159 ballots cast by the borough's 2,717 registered voters (23 ballots were spoiled), for a turnout of 42.7%. In the 2009 gubernatorial election, Republican Chris Christie received 60.3% of the vote (691 ballots cast), ahead of  Democrat Jon Corzine with 29.4% (337 votes), Independent Chris Daggett with 6.6% (75 votes) and other candidates with 2.7% (31 votes), among the 1,145 ballots cast by the borough's 2,294 registered voters, yielding a 49.9% turnout.

Education
The Riverdale School District serves students in pre-kindergarten through eighth grade at Riverdale Public School. As of the 2018–19 school year, the district, comprised of one school, had an enrollment of 336 students and 30.8 classroom teachers (on an FTE basis), for a student–teacher ratio of 10.9:1.

Public school students in ninth through twelfth grades attend Pompton Lakes High School in Pompton Lakes, as part of a sending/receiving relationship with the Pompton Lakes School District. As of the 2018–19 school year, the high school had an enrollment of 642 students and 52.4 classroom teachers (on an FTE basis), for a student–teacher ratio of 12.3:1.

Transportation

Roads and highways

Route 23 is the main east–west road while Interstate 287 is the major north–south thoroughfare (with exits 52 and 53 in the borough). County Route 511 Alternate also passes through Riverdale.

Public transportation
NJ Transit offers bus service to the Port Authority Bus Terminal in Midtown Manhattan on the 194 route. In September 2012, as part of budget cuts, NJ Transit suspended service to Newark on the 75 line.

Notable people

People who were born in, residents of, or otherwise closely associated with Riverdale include:

 Jacqueline Dubrovich (born 1994), foil fencer
 Kris Foster (born 1974), former MLB pitcher who played for the Baltimore Orioles

References

External links

 Riverdale Borough website
 Riverdale Public School
 
 School Data for the Riverdale Public School, National Center for Education Statistics
 Suburban Trends regional area newspaper

 
1923 establishments in New Jersey
Borough form of New Jersey government
Boroughs in Morris County, New Jersey
Populated places established in 1923